This is a list of Minnesota Golden Gophers football players in the NFL Draft.

Key

Selections

References

Minnesota

Minnesota Golden Gophers NFL Draft